Jane Perlez is a long time foreign correspondent for The New York Times. She served as Beijing Bureau Chief in China until 2019, where she wrote about China's role in the world, and the competition between the United States and China, particularly in Asia. Perlez arrived in Beijing in February 2012, and left in 2019. 

Perlez won the Pulitzer Prize in 2009 for coverage of the war against the Taliban and al Qaeda in Pakistan and Afghanistan, a lead member of the group of New York Times reporters included in the prize for international reporting that year.

Early life
Born in London, Perlez grew up in  Australia, and graduated from the University of Sydney. In 1967, she traveled to China with a group of Australian students who went for a vacation but ended up spending three weeks in the middle of the Cultural Revolution. She got her first taste of the United States during an American Field Service scholarship in the mid-60s, and after three years in her first journalism job - at The Australian newspaper - she left Australia for New York in 1972. There she joined The New York Post to cover politics, leaving when Rupert Murdoch bought the newspaper in 1977. She worked briefly at the SoHo Weekly News, writing a media and political column, and then for a year-long stint, joined The New York Daily News. She began her career at The New York Times in 1981.

Career
At the start of her career as a foreign correspondent, Perlez was a Pulitzer finalist for coverage of the famine in Somalia, and the dispatch of American forces.

Perlez served as bureau chief in Nairobi, Kenya from 1988 to 1992 when civil wars were raging in Sudan, Ethiopia and Somalia. In 1993, she became bureau chief in Warsaw, Poland, writing about the emergence of Central Europe from grip of the Cold War. In 1996, she moved to Vienna, a base for covering the Serbian leader, Slobodan Milosevic, and his aggression against Kosovo. As Chief Diplomatic Correspondent based in Washington, Perlez traveled with Secretary of State, Madeleine K. Albright, to Asia, Europe and Africa, and covered Secretary Colin Powell during his first year in the job. In 2002, she moved to Jakarta, Indonesia, where she first noted the rise of China and its impact on Southeast Asia, a series of articles that were among the first to document China's increasing influence in the region. For a series of articles on gold mining in Indonesia and in Peru, and the deleterious impact of the mining on local communities, she won the Overseas Press Club award for environmental reporting.

During four years based in Islamabad, Pakistan, Perlez wrote about the rising tensions between the United States and Pakistan, and the deep underlying differences between the two countries that were officially allies in the war on terror. Her articles included reporting on the Inter Services Intelligence and the Pakistani army, as well as on the Taliban, and their ability to strike at the core of Pakistan's institutions. Several articles pin pointed the involvement of the Pakistani army and intelligence service in extra judicial killings, including the murder of a Pakistani journalist in 2011. During her seven years in Beijing, Perlez covered Xi Jinping's growing power at home and abroad. Her stories for the New York Times included coverage of Xi's visit to the United States in 2015; his creation of the Belt and Road Initiative; the program MADE IN CHINA 2025; and AAIB. She hosted a podcast about Xi's rise for the Shorenstein Center at Harvard University. In 2022, she hosted a podcast series called The Great Wager, about how Richard Nixon and Henry Kissinger made friends with China 50 years ago, and how it's all falling apart. The podcast will also air on NPR's Here and Now (Boston) in February.

References

External links
 The New York Times - articles by Jane Perlez
 

Year of birth missing (living people)
Living people
The New York Times writers
English emigrants to Australia
American newspaper reporters and correspondents
Australian emigrants to the United States
Australian expatriates in Pakistan
University of Sydney alumni
English emigrants to the United States
American expatriates in China